The CTFA International Tournament was a tier 1 international football competition held in Taipei, Taiwan from 1-5 December 2017, organized by the Chinese Taipei Football Association (CTFA). Results involving the Philippines national football team led to strong reactions by Filipino football fans, and disputes between football administrators. The six games in the tournament were authorized by FIFA as International “A” Matches.

Participating nations
Four nations participated in the tournament.

Venue

Matches 

All times are National Standard Time – UTC+8

Goalscorers

Aftermath
After the 1-2 win–loss result by the Philippines national football team, particularly the loss to 196th-ranked Timor-Leste on the  seventh anniversary of the "Miracle in Hanoi", Philippines fans reacted with disappointment and anger. Former national team manager Dan Palami joined in criticism of team selection, although the Philippines Football Federation was limited by player commitments to teams involved in the 2017 Philippines Football League finals series. The decision to send a team to the tournament during the PFL finals was also questioned, along with concern about the expected effect on the Philippines national team's FIFA World Ranking, which subsequently dropped six spots in the December 2017 FIFA rankings. Vietnam
surpassed the Philippines as top national men's team in Southeast Asia. Jefferson Cheng, manager of the CTFA International Tournament team and owner of Davao Aguilas FC,  defended selection decisions, asking that supporters consider the value of giving young players experience in International “A” Matches.

In contrast, the Chinese Taipei Football Association reacted enthusiastically to the Chinese Taipei 3-0 tournament victory, reporting it as a high point in their history.

The Timor-Leste national team was reported by the Taipei Times to be "delighted" by their unexpected win over the Philippines after losing each of their earlier games by one goal. Timor-Leste rose five spots in the December 2017 FIFA rankings on the strength of this win.

Notes

References

CTFA International Tournament
International association football competitions hosted by Taiwan
December 2017 sports events in Asia
International men's association football invitational tournaments